Ivan Paunović (Serbian Cyrillic: Иван Пауновић; born 17 June 1986) is a Serbian football midfielder.

He signed his first contract in 2003 with FK Smederevo playing back then in the First League of Serbia and Montenegro. Still young and after not getting any chance to play in the league during that year, he decided to continue his career in lower league clubs such as FK Sloga Požega, FK Vujić Voda and FK Sloboda Užice. In summer 2006 he moved to FK Mladi Radnik and after a good first half of the season, he spent the next six months on loan with FK Voždovac playing then in the 2006–07 Serbian SuperLiga. Unfortunately FK Voždovac ended the seasons relegated, but Paunović impressed and the club signed him and he will end up playing two more seasons with them. In 2009, he moved to FK Srem Sremska Mitrovica and after six months Romanian Liga I club FC Universitatea Craiova signed him. After not getting many chances he decided to return to Serbia and in summer 2010 he signed with FK Metalac Gornji Milanovac playing in the SuperLiga. In winter break of 2010-11 he was loaned to FK Novi Pazar to help the club to reach its ambitions to end the season promoted to the SuperLiga for its first time.

External links
 
 Ivan Paunović at Srbijafudbal
 Ivan Paunović Stats at Utakmica.rs

1986 births
Living people
Sportspeople from Užice
Serbian footballers
Association football midfielders
FK Smederevo players
FK Sloboda Užice players
FK Mladi Radnik players
FK Voždovac players
FK Srem players
FC U Craiova 1948 players
FK Metalac Gornji Milanovac players
FK Novi Pazar players
Serbian SuperLiga players
Liga I players
Expatriate footballers in Romania